Tylocephale (meaning "swollen head", from the Greek τυλη meaning 'callus' or 'hard swelling' and κεφαλη meaning 'head') is a genus of pachycephalosaurid dinosaur from the Late Cretaceous period. It had the tallest dome of any known pachycephalosaur.

Tylocephale lived during the Campanian stage, around 74 million years ago. It was discovered in the Khulsan locality of the Barun Goyot Formation, Mongolia sometime between 1965 and 1971. The type species is T. gilmorei, described by Teresa Maryańska and Osmólska in 1974 based on a partial skull (specimen ZPAL MgD-I/105).

Pachycephalosaurids evolved in Asia and then migrated into North America, thus it is likely that Tylocephale migrated back into Asia. It is closely related to Prenocephale.

See also
 Timeline of pachycephalosaur research

References

External links

 Tylocephale in the National History Museum's Dino Directory

Late Cretaceous dinosaurs of Asia
Fossil taxa described in 1974
Pachycephalosaurs
Taxa named by Teresa Maryańska
Taxa named by Halszka Osmólska
Ornithischian genera